Phillip Asiodu, (CON) (born 19 February 1934) is a Nigerian Diplomat, Bureaucrat and former Minister of Petroleum, Nigeria.

Life and career
Phillip was born February 26, 1934, in Lagos State, southwestern Nigeria.
He attended King's College, Lagos before he proceeded to Queen's College, Oxford where he obtained a master's degree in Philosophy.
He joined the Nigerian Civil service in 1964 and became the Federal Permanent Secretary, and first served under General Gowon before and during the Nigeria-Biafra war. He was instrumental in the U-turn on the Aburi Accord by Gowon.
He later became Special Adviser to the President of the Federal Republic of Nigeria, Alhaji Shehu Shagari  on economic affairs.
In 1999, he was appointed Chief Economic Adviser to the former Nigerian President, Chief Olusegun Obasanjo. Among other leadership roles includes the planning and implementation of Nigeria’s oil and gas policies. He also took part in the negotiations for Nigeria’s admission into OPEC, 1971.

His younger brother, the athlete Sidney Asiodu died in the Asaba massacre.

Political life
In 1998, he became a member of the People's Democratic Party, and a Trustee of the party. In 1999, he contested nomination as the party’s Presidential candidate but unsuccessful.

Awards
Commander of the Order of the Niger

References

See also
Anioma people

Nigerian diplomats
1934 births
Federal ministers of Nigeria
Living people
People from Delta State
Alumni of The Queen's College, Oxford
King's College, Lagos alumni